|}

This is a list of House of Assembly results for the 1993 South Australian state election.

Results by electoral district

Adelaide

Bragg

Bright

Chaffey

Coles

Colton

Custance

Davenport

Elder

Elizabeth

Eyre

Finniss

Fisher

Flinders

Florey

Frome

Giles

Gordon

Goyder

Hanson 

 Hanson was made a notionally Labor held seat at the redistribution.

Hart 

 Hart is the new name of the abolished district of Semaphore, which was held by Independent Labor MP Norm Peterson, who contested the Legislative Council.

Hartley 

Hartley became a notional Liberal seat in the redistribution.

Heysen

Kaurna

Kavel

Lee

Light

MacKillop

Mawson

Mitchell

Morphett

Napier

Newland 

 Newland was a notionally Labor held seat at the redistribution.

Norwood

Peake

Playford

Price

Ramsay

Reynell

Ridley

Ross Smith

Spence

Taylor

Torrens

Unley

Waite

Wright

See also
 Members of the South Australian House of Assembly, 1993–1997

References

SA elections archive: Antony Green ABC

1993
1993 elections in Australia
1990s in South Australia